The 1913 Copa de Honor Municipalidad de Buenos Aires was the final that decided the champion of the 9th. edition of this National cup of Argentina. In the match, held in Ferro C. Oeste Stadium in Caballito, Buenos Aires, Racing Club beat Club Atlético Estudiantes 5–1, winning its second consecutive Copa de Honor trophy. On the other hand, it was the third and last Copa de Honor final played by Estudiantes, with no success.

Qualified teams 

Note

Overview 
The 1918 edition was contested by 18 clubs, 13 within Buenos Aires Province, and 5 from Santa Fe Province (4 from Liga Rosarina de Football, and one from the city of Santa Fe). Playing in a single-elimination tournament, Racing beat C.A. Ferrocarril Sud (6–1), Estudiantil Porteño (4–0 in Avellaneda), and Club Atlético San Isidro (2–0 in the semifinal, also in Avellaneda).

On the other side, Estudiantes beat C.A. Riachuelo (3–0 in Barracas), River Plate (4–2 in Dársena Sur), Belgrano A.C. (unknown score, at its own field in Palermo), and Boca Juniors (5–4 in extra time, at San Isidro). The final was held in Ferro C. Oeste Stadium on November 9, 1913. Racing beat Estudiantes 5–1, also winning its second consecutive Copa de Honor title.

Match details

References

M
1913 in Argentine football
Football in Buenos Aires